The 2015 Denmark Super Series Premier was the ninth Super Series badminton tournament of the 2015 BWF Super Series. The tournament took place in Odense, Denmark from October 13–18, 2015 and had a total prize of $650,000. 
A qualification was held to fill four places in all five disciplines of the main draws.

Men's singles

Seeds

Top half

Bottom half

Finals

Women's singles

Seeds

Top half

Bottom half

Finals

Men's doubles

Seeds

Top half

Bottom half

Finals

Women's doubles

Seeds

Top half

Bottom half
{{16TeamBracket-Compact-Tennis3
| RD1=First Round
| RD2=Second Round
| RD3=Quarterfinals
| RD4=Semifinals

| RD1-seed01=
| RD1-team01= G Stoeva S Stoeva
| RD1-score01-1=21
| RD1-score01-2=21
| RD1-score01-3=
| RD1-seed02=
| RD1-team02= A Bruce P Chan
| RD1-score02-1=15
| RD1-score02-2=11
| RD1-score02-3=

| RD1-seed03=PFQ
| RD1-team03= M Batomene E Lefel
| RD1-score03-1=5
| RD1-score03-2=17
| RD1-score03-3=
| RD1-seed04=5
| RD1-team04= Tian Q Zhao YL
| RD1-score04-1=21
| RD1-score04-2=21
| RD1-score04-3=

| RD1-seed05=
| RD1-team05= H Olver L Smith
| RD1-score05-1=11
| RD1-score05-2=20
| RD1-score05-3=
| RD1-seed06=
| RD1-team06=

Finals

Mixed doubles

Seeds

Top half

Bottom half

Finals

References

External links
 Denmark Open  at www.badmintondenmark.com

Denmark Open
Denmark Open Super Series Premier
Denmark Open Super Series Premier
Sport in Odense